League1 Ontario (L1O) is a semi-professional women's soccer league in Ontario, Canada. The league is sanctioned by the Canadian Soccer Association and the Ontario Soccer Association as a pro-am league in the Canadian soccer league system. The L1O women's division part of League1 Canada, the national third tier with regional divisions, with L1O equivalent to the Première ligue de soccer du Québec and League1 British Columbia.

The women's division launched in 2015 with seven clubs and has grown to twenty clubs for the 2022 season. Beginning in 2024, the league will become a three-tier league featuring promotion and relegation.

History

League1 Ontario was founded as a men's semi-professional league on November 15, 2013, in an announcement by the Ontario Soccer Association (OSA).

In January 2015, L1O announced the launch of a women's division. Initially, six teams (ANB Futbol, Durham United FC, North Mississauga SC, ProStars FC, Sanjaxx Lions and Vaughan Azzurri) were to compete, but a seventh team (Woodbridge Strikers) was soon added ahead of the inaugural season. The league kicked off their first matches on May 23 with all seven teams playing matches at Tim Hortons Field in Hamilton (Ottawa Fury FC Academy also fielded a team for an exhibition match to make an even number so that every team could play). Durham United FC defeated North Mississauga SC by a score of 2–0 in the league's first official match. Durham United were the inaugural league champions. while North Mississauga won the first League Cup title.

For the 2016 season, the division grew to nine teams with the addition of four teams, while two clubs departed. The league grew to 11 teams in 2017, with three new additions and one departure. In 2018, the league grew to 13 teams and the league introduced a playoff format for the first time to declare the league champion. For the 2019 season, the league eliminated the League Cup competition.

Beginning in the 2020 season, League1 Ontario and the Première ligue de soccer du Québec had planned to hold a Final Four end-of-season tournament for their women's divisions, from August 14 to 16, pitting the top two sides from each league in an inter-provincial playoff. Also, the league had planned to introduce a Reserve Division for the women for the first time. However, due to restrictions associated with the COVID-19 pandemic, the league cancelled the 2020 season and delayed the start of the 2021 season. Due to the delayed start caused by the pandemic, some clubs were unable to field team's in the main division. Consequently, the league also formed a short-season summer division, with teams opting to either play in the full-season Premier division, the short-season Champion, and/or the Reserve division.

On January 25, 2022, League1 Ontario announced a major restructuring of the men's and women's competitions to commence in 2024. The league will be split into three tiers (Premier, Championship, and League2) with promotion and relegation between the tiers.
Future expansion clubs will enter at the League2 level and will have to win to earn promotion to the Championship and then Premier divisions. Also in 2024 will be the return of the L1 Cup, a league cup knockout tournament which will feature teams from all three tiers in the L1O system.

Management
In September 2019, former Canadian national team player Carmelina Moscato was announced as Commissioner of the Women's division (prior to this both the male and female divisions were led by Dino Rossi), however she departed in December 2020 to become the Director of Women's Football for the Bahamas Football Association. In March 2021, Chelsea Spencer and Julie Maheu were announced as Director and Operations Manager, respectively, for the league.

Competition format 

The League1 Ontario regular season runs from May through September using a single table format, with each team playing one match against all other teams. The top four teams compete in the league playoffs at the end of the season.

Beginning in 2019, the Ron Smale Cup was created by the supporters group of North Mississauga SC to be given to the regular season champions.

L1 Cup
The L1 Cup is a league cup tournament that features all L1O clubs. It runs concurrently with the regular season, with cup games usually taking place during mid-week. It is not a form of playoffs and all matches are separate from the regular season and are not reflected in the season standings. The 2015 cup included a group stage and a knockout stage but from 2016 to 2018 the format was a single-elimination tournament. Following a hiatus from 2019 to 2023, the L1 Cup will return in 2024 to coincide with the league's restructuring.

Yearly results

Clubs

Current clubs

Currently there are 20 clubs, based mainly in the Greater Toronto Area and other cities in Southern Ontario. There are no clubs based in Northern Ontario.

Former clubs

Timeline

Players who earned national team caps while in L1O
The following players have earned a senior national team cap while playing in League1 Ontario (the year of their first cap while playing in the league is listed). Players who earned caps before or after playing in League1 Ontario are not included, unless they also earned caps while in the league. This section also does not include youth caps (U23 or below).

See also

 Canadian soccer league system
 Première ligue de soccer du Québec
 League1 Ontario (men)
 League1 British Columbia
 United Women's Soccer

References

External links
 

 
Soccer leagues in Ontario
Women's association football leagues in North America
Women's soccer competitions in Canada
Sports leagues established in 2015
2015 establishments in Ontario
League1 Canada